Alexander Alexandrovich Mikulin (February 14 (O.S. February 2), 1895, Vladimir – May 13, 1985, Moscow) was a Soviet Russian aircraft engine designer and chief designer in the Mikulin OKB. His achievements include the first Soviet liquid-cooled aircraft piston engine, the Mikulin AM-34, and the Mikulin AM-3 turbojet engine for the Soviet Union's first jet airliner, the Tupolev Tu-104. Mikulin also took part in the Tsar Tank project.

Wife - Soviet Union actress of teater and sinema Garen Zhukovskaya (6 [19] of February 1912, Moscow — 9 of March 2007, Moscow) — советская актриса театра и кино.

Engines
 M-17 - BMW VI built under licence
 AM-34
 AM-35 - Super charged inline 895-1007kw 
 AM-37 - improved AM-35; only produced in small numbers as it was too unreliable
 AM-38 - low-altitude engine developed from the AM-35A
 AM-39 - higher power version of the AM-35A
 AM-41 - used on the Gudkov Gu-1
 AM-42 - higher power version of the AM-38F
 AM-43 - high-altitude engine, used on Tupolev Tu-1 and Ilyushin Il-16
 AM-44 - turbo-supercharged engine, used on Tupolev Tu-2DB
 AM-45
 AM-46
 AM-47 - used on the Ilyushin Il-20
 AM-2
 AM-3/RD-3
 AM-5 - renamed Tumansky RD-9 after Sergei Tumansky replaced Alexander Mikulin

References 

Mikulin, Alexander
Mikulin, Alexander
Mikulin, Alexander
Mikulin, Alexander
Mikulin, Alexander
 
Bauman Moscow State Technical University alumni
Full Members of the USSR Academy of Sciences
Soviet inventors
Baranov Central Institute of Aviation Motors employees